is a railway station on the Nippō Main Line in Saiki, Ōita, Japan, operated by Kyūshū Railway Company (JR Kyushu).

Lines
Naokawa Station is served by the Nippō Main Line.

Adjacent stations

History
The Kyushu Railway was nationalised on 1 July 1907. Japanese Government Railways (JGR), designated the track as the Hōshū Main Line on 12 October 1909 and expanded it southwards in phases, with this station opening on 20 November 1920 with the name  as the new southern terminus. On 15 December 1923, the Hōshū Main Line which served the station had linked up with the Miyazaki Main Line to the south. The entire stretch of track was then renamed the Nippō Main Line. On 20 March 1961, Gonohara was renamed Naokawa. With the privatization of Japanese National Railways (JNR), the successor of JGR, on 1 April 1987, the station came under the control of JR Kyushu.

Passenger statistics
In fiscal 2015, there were a total of 5,613 boarding passengers, giving a daily average of 15 passengers.

See also
 List of railway stations in Japan

References

External links

  

Railway stations in Ōita Prefecture
Railway stations in Japan opened in 1920